Ian Carradice is an authority on the coinages of ancient Greece, Rome, Persia and Carthage, and the history of museums. He is the former professor of ancient numismatics at the University of St Andrews and the director of the museums of that university.

Career
Carradice joined the British Museum's Department of Coins and Medals in 1977 where he worked as curator of ancient near eastern coins until 1989 when he joined St Andrews university. He became professor of ancient numismatics there and retired in 2012 when the university held a symposium in his honour.

Carradice is a member of the British government's Treasure Valuation Committee.

Selected publications
Ancient Greek portrait coins. British Museum Publications, London, 1978. 
Coinage and finances in the reign of Domitian. British Archaeological Reports, Oxford, 1983.  
Coinage in the Greek world. Spink, London, 1988. (With Martin Price) 
The coin atlas: The world of coinage from its origins to the present day. Macdonald, London, 1990. (With Joe Cribb & Barrie Cook)
Greek coins. British Museum Press, London, 1995. 
The Roman imperial coinage. Volume II, part 1, From AD 69-96, Vespasian to Domitian. Spink, London. 2007. (2nd revised edition) (With Theodore V. Buttrey)

References 

Living people
Academics of the University of St Andrews
People associated with the British Museum
Year of birth missing (living people)
British numismatists